Rudy Reyes or Rudolph Reyes may refer to:

 Rudy Reyes (activist), born 1977
 Rudy Reyes (actor), born 1971
 Rudy Reyes (athlete), born 1979